Debraj Roy College (informally known as D. R. College or D. R.) is a leading public higher education institution established in 1949 at Jonaki Nagar in Golaghat. Affiliated to Dibrugarh University, the college has 15 departments running Higher Secondary and Undergraduate programmes both in Science and Arts. The college also offers Postgraduate and Doctoral Research programmes in Life Science in regular mode under Dibrugarh University. The college has a current enrollment of more than 2500 students. The college was ranked 4th among the colleges of Assam by Career360 in 2016.

History
Debraj Roy College came into being in the wake of independence of the country around 1949. In the post independence period, there was a surging atmosphere of great joy and excitement all over the country and this tempo was also felt in an isolated and sleepy town like Golaghat.
There was a craze for higher education among all sections of the people, particularly the students. At that time, there was only one college at Jorhat for the upper Assam region. Higher education was out of reach for the general students of this educationally backward district. This consideration led some spirited persons of the district to establish a college at Golaghat. The institution may be regarded as the brain child of Ayodhya Prasad Goswami, who was a student leader, Biplobi Bir Sankar Baruah, a revolutionary leader of the freedom movement, Golap Ch. Goswami, Dr. Promodaviram Das, Jadunath Saikia, etc. The college was named after the late Debraj Roy, the founder of Bogidhala Tea & Trading Company, Goalghat, in whose memory his son Surendra Nath Ray, the then M.D. of Bogidhala Tea & Trading Company, donated an amount for the construction of the main building of the college.

Academics
Besides Higher Secondary classes for both arts and science streams the college offers option for studies at Undergraduate level (Six Semesters Degree Course with Major in all subjects) both in Arts and Science streams. Post Graduate study is possible in Economics and Life Sciences departments. The college also has the provision for Doctoral Research in Life Sciences under faculty research supervises of the college under Dibrugarh University.

Institutional Biotech Hub
The college has an institutional Biotech Hub with state-of-the-art infrastructure for research in the relevant areas.

Departments
There are 15 academic departments in the college which offer both major and core courses in science as well as arts streams. The academic departments of the college are:

Life Sciences (Postgraduate),
English,
Assamese,
Political Science,
History,
Education,
Economics,
Philosophy,
Chemistry,
Physics,
Mathematics,
Zoology,
Botany,
Statistics,
Biotechnology, and
Computer Science.

Recognition and accreditation
Debraj Roy College is recognised under 2f and 12b sections of the UGC Act 1956 and has been accredited with A grade by NAAC for its third cycle of assessment in 2023. It was also declared by UGC as a "College with Potential for Excellence" in the year 2010 and for a second term in 2014.

Notable alumni and teachers

Arupa Patangia Kalita
Binoy Kumar Saikia 
Debo Prasad Barooah
Edward Pritchard Gee
Gunaram Khanikar
Nagen Saikia

Footnotes

External links
The Official Website of Debraj Roy College

Educational institutions established in 1949
Universities and colleges in Golaghat
1949 establishments in India
Colleges affiliated to Dibrugarh University